Nazlı Savranbaşı (born 9 October 2003) is a Turkish artistic gymnast. She represented Turkey at the 2020 Summer Olympics and at the 2018 Summer Youth Olympics. She is the 2019 Mersin World Challenge Cup champion on the uneven bars. She is the 2020 Turkish all-around champion and the 2018 Turkish junior all-around champion.

Career 
Savranbaşı began gymnastics when she was four years old.

Junior 
Savranbaşı won the bronze medal in the junior all-around at the 2017 Turkish Championships. She then made her international debut at the Austrian Team Open where the Turkish team finished sixth, and Savranbaşı finished seventeenth in the all-around. Then at the FIT Challenge in Ghent, she helped the Turkish junior team finish eighth. She finished nineteenth with the Turkish team at the 2017 European Youth Summer Olympic Festival.

Savranbaşı won the gold medal in the all-around at the 2018 Turkish Championships. She then competed at the 2018 Gymnasiade where she finished fourteenth in the all-around, and she tied for fifth place in the vault final. She took bronze medals in the vault and uneven bars and the gold medal in the floor exercise at the 2018 Gym Festival Trnava in Slovakia. She then finished eleventh at the Youth Olympic Qualifier and qualified Turkey a spot for the 2018 Summer Youth Olympics. The Turkish team finished thirteenth at the 2018 European Championships, and Savranbaşı finished twenty-second in the all-around. She competed at the 2018 Summer Youth Olympics in Buenos Aires, Argentina but did not advance to any finals. She finished eleventh in the mixed multi-discipline team event.

Senior 
Savranbaşı won the bronze medal in the all-around at her first senior Turkish Championships. She then competed at the 2019 Baku World Cup where she finished ninth in the floor exercise final. She competed at the 2019 European Championships but did not qualify for any finals. She began competing in the German Bundesliga for the Berkheim club. Berkheim finished second in League 2 at the 2nd Bundesliga event, and Savranbaşı won the all-around. She then competed at the Koper World Challenge Cup and finished seventh on the uneven bars. She was selected to represent Turkey at the 2019 European Games where she finished twenty-sixth in the all-around during the qualification round. She won the gold medal on the uneven bars at the Mersin World Challenge Cup. At the 2019 World Championships, she finished sixty-first in the all-around and qualified a spot for the 2020 Olympic Games. After the World Championships, she competed at the 3rd Bundesliga where Berkheim finished eighth, and Savranbaşı finished third in the all-around.

Savranbaşı won the gold medal in the all-around at the 2020 Turkish Championships. At the 2021 Turkish Championships, she only competed on the uneven bars where she won the bronze medal. She then competed at the 2021 European Championships but did not advance to any finals. She finished sixth on the uneven bars at the 2021 Osijek World Challenge Cup. She then competed at the postponed-2020 Summer Olympics, but she did not advance past the qualifying round.

Savranbaşı represented Turkey at the 2022 Mediterranean Games where the Turkish team finished fourth in the team final. She qualfied for the uneven bars final where she finished eighth. She then competed at the 2022 European Championships where the Turkish team finished twentieth.

Competition history

References

External links

 

2003 births
Living people
People from Konak
Sportspeople from İzmir
Turkish female artistic gymnasts
Gymnasts at the 2018 Summer Youth Olympics
Gymnasts at the 2019 European Games
European Games competitors for Turkey
Gymnasts at the 2020 Summer Olympics
Olympic gymnasts of Turkey
Gymnasts at the 2022 Mediterranean Games
21st-century Turkish women